The Catholic Youth Organization Ghana (CYO Ghana) is a Catholic youth organization in Ghana. CYO Ghana is a member of the Catholic umbrella of youth organizations Fimcap.

History 
CYO Ghana was founded on 22 August 1948.

Organization
CYO Ghana is structured in the following sections (based on age-groups):

See also 
 International Federation of Catholic Parochial Youth Movements (Fimcap)
 Catholic Youth Organization (CYO)

References

Catholic youth organizations
Youth organisations based in Ghana
Fimcap
Catholic Church in Ghana